Edward Harper may refer to:

 Edward Harper (engineer), British broadcasting engineer in Ceylon
 Edward Eugene Harper (born 1946),  American former fugitive
 Edward John Harper (1910–1990), American prelate of the Roman Catholic Church
 Edward S. Harper (1854–1941), President of the Royal Birmingham Society of Artists